Haplogroup W is a human mitochondrial DNA (mtDNA) haplogroup.

Origin
Haplogroup W is believed to have originated around 23,900 years ago in Western Asia. It is descended from the haplogroup N2.

Distribution

Haplogroup W is found in Europe, Western Asia, and South Asia. It is widely distributed at low frequencies, with a high concentration in Northern Pakistan. Haplogroup W is also found in the Maghreb among Algerians (1.08%-3.23%) and in Siberia among Yakuts (6/423 = 1.42%).

Additionally, the clade has been observed among ancient Egyptian mummies excavated at the Abusir el-Meleq archaeological site in Middle Egypt, which date from the Ptolemaic Kingdom.

The W5 subclade has been found in a fossil associated with the Starčevo culture (Lánycsók site; 1/1 or 100%).

Ancient DNA analysis found that the medieval individual Sungir 6 (730-850 cal BP) belonged to the W3a1 subclade.

Subclades

Tree

This phylogenetic tree of haplogroup W subclades is based on the paper by Mannis van Oven and Manfred Kayser Updated comprehensive phylogenetic tree of global human mitochondrial DNA variation and subsequent published research.

W
W1
W1a
W1b
W1b1
W1-T119C
W1c
W1c1
W1d
W1e
W1e1
W1e1a
W1f
W1g
W1h
W1h1
W-C194T
W3
W3a
W3a1
W3a1a
W3a1a1
W3a1a2
W3a1a3
W3a1b
W3a1-T199C
W3a1c
W3a1d
W3a2
W3b
W3b1
W4
W4a
W4a1
W4b
W4c
W4d
W5
W5a
W5a1
W5a1a
W5a1a1
W5a1a1a
W5a2
W5a2b
W5b
W5b1
W5b1a
W6
W6a
W6b
W6c
W7
W8
W9

See also 

Genealogical DNA test
Genetic genealogy
Human mitochondrial genetics
Population genetics

References

External links 
General
Mannis van Oven's Phylotree
The India Genealogical DNA Project
Haplogroup W
Spread of Haplogroup W, from National Geographic
mtDNA Haplogroup W Project

W